Scotts Mills is a city in Marion County, Oregon, United States. The population was 419 at the 2020 census.

Scotts Mills is part of the Salem Metropolitan Statistical Area. It is near the site of the 1993 Scotts Mills earthquake.

Name
The city takes its name from the sawmill and flour mill owned by Robert Hall Scott and Thomas Scott at this location, which became known as Scotts Mills in about 1866. Thomas Scott was the first postmaster at the post office established here in 1887.

Geography

Butte Creek flows just to the east of Scotts Mills as it makes its way north to join the Pudding River.

Climate
This region experiences warm (but not hot) and dry summers, with no average monthly temperatures above .  According to the Köppen Climate Classification system, Scotts Mills has a warm-summer Mediterranean climate, abbreviated "Csb" on climate maps.

Demographics

2010 census
As of the census of 2010, there were 357 people, 131 households, and 93 families residing in the city. The racial makeup of the city was 97.5% White, 0.3% Native American, 1.4% Asian, and 0.8% from two or more races. Hispanic or Latino of any race were 2.2% of the population.

There were 131 households, of which 32.1% had children under the age of 18 living with them, 61.1% were married couples living together, 4.6% had a female householder with no husband present, 5.3% had a male householder with no wife present, and 29.0% were non-families. 19.1% of all households were made up of individuals, and 5.3% had someone living alone who was 65 years of age or older. The average household size was 2.73 and the average family size was 3.17.

The median age in the city was 40.8 years. 24.9% of residents were under the age of 18; 8.9% were between the ages of 18 and 24; 21.9% were from 25 to 44; 32.5% were from 45 to 64; and 11.8% were 65 years of age or older. The gender makeup of the city was 53.5% male and 46.5% female.

2000 census
As of the census of 2000, there were 312 people, 107 households, and 80 families residing in the city. The population density was 988.6 people per square mile (376.4/km). There were 108 housing units at an average density of 342.2 per square mile (130.3/km). The racial makeup of the city was 93.91% White, 0.64% from other races, and 5.45% from two or more races. Hispanic or Latino of any race were 3.53% of the population.

There were 107 households, out of which 37.4% had children under the age of 18 living with them, 53.3% were married couples living together, 13.1% had a female householder with no husband present, and 25.2% were non-families. 18.7% of all households were made up of individuals, and 5.6% had someone living alone who was 65 years of age or older. The average household size was 2.92 and the average family size was 3.30.

In the city, the population was spread out, with 28.8% under the age of 18, 8.0% from 18 to 24, 30.8% from 25 to 44, 19.6% from 45 to 64, and 12.8% who were 65 years of age or older. The median age was 36 years. For every 100 females, there were 103.9 males. For every 100 females age 18 and over, there were 100.0 males.

The median income for a household in the city was $35,208, and the median income for a family was $37,500. Males had a median income of $31,000 versus $20,000 for females. The per capita income for the city was $15,033. About 9.0% of families and 10.7% of the population were below the poverty line, including 16.3% of those under age 18 and 2.3% of those age 65 or over.

Scotts Mill Park

Open from 8 a.m. to sunset from May to October, it has play fields and equipment, picnic tables, and restrooms, a waterfall, a wading pool, and a swimming hole in Butte Creek.

References

External links

 Entry for Scotts Mills in the Oregon Blue Book

Cities in Oregon
Cities in Marion County, Oregon
Salem, Oregon metropolitan area
1916 establishments in Oregon